Club de Fútbol Vimenor is a football team based in Vioño de Piélagos, Piélagos in the autonomous community of Cantabria. Founded in 1929 as a section of the factory "Vimenor" ("VIdriera MEcánica del NORte"), the team plays in Tercera División RFEF – Group 3. The club's home ground is La Vidriera, which has a capacity of 1,500 spectators.

History
The club finished 7th in Tercera División, Group 3 in the 2015–16 season. In the 2018–19 season, the club finished 8th in the Tercera División, Group 3.

Season to season

25 seasons in Tercera División
1 season in Tercera División RFEF

References

External links
Official website
Futbolme team profile 

Football clubs in Cantabria
Association football clubs established in 1929
1929 establishments in Spain